FC Sakhalinets Moscow is an amateur, turned professional, Russian football team based in Moscow.

History
The club was founded in 2020 by Mikhail Litvin. Litvin was born in Sakhalin and named the club in reference to that ("Sakhalinets" means "a person from Sakhalin").

For the 2022–23 season, the club obtained a professional license for the Russian Second League.

Current squad
As of 22 February 2023, according to the Second League website.

References

Association football clubs established in 2020
Football clubs in Russia
Football clubs in Moscow
2020 establishments in Russia